Statistics of Dhivehi League in the 1986 season.

Overview
Victory SC won the championship.

References
RSSSF

Dhivehi League seasons
Maldives
Maldives
Dhivehi